King Bee  and Kingbee  may refer to:

 Queen bee
 King Bee (UK band), a UK jazz-funk band
King Bees (band), American, mid-1960s
 King Bee (band), American band
 The Kingbees, American rockabilly band formed by Jamie James
 King Bee (album), a 1981 blues album by Muddy Waters
 Kingbee, Missouri, a ghost town in the United States
 King-Bee Films, an American silent film era production company
 "I'm a King Bee", a song composed by Slim Harpo, and covered by Muddy Waters, The Rolling Stones and Pink Floyd
 Kingbee, Nickname for the Vietnam Air Force Sikorsky H-34 helicopter

See also
 Bee King (1866-1949), politician in Mississippi